Allendale may refer to:

Places

Australia
 Allendale, Victoria, a town

Canada
 Allendale, Edmonton, a neighbourhood

England
 Allendale, Northumberland

United States
 Allendale, Fremont, California, part of Fremont, California
 Allendale, Oakland, California, former community now part of Oakland, California
 Allendale, Gwinnett County, Georgia, unincorporated community
 Allendale, Muscogee County, Georgia, unincorporated community
 Allendale, Illinois, village
 Allendale, Indiana, unincorporated community
 Allendale, Michigan, census-designated place
 Allendale Charter Township, Michigan
 Allendale, Missouri, city
 Allendale, New Jersey, borough
 Allendale, South Carolina, town
 Allendale, West Virginia
 Allendale County, South Carolina
 The former name of Kissimmee, Florida, before its incorporation in 1883

Other uses
 Allendale, a version of the Intel Core 2 microprocessor
 Viscount Allendale, a title in the peerage of the United Kingdom

See also
 Alan Dale (disambiguation)
 Allandale (disambiguation)
 Allandale station (disambiguation)